Arkady Dmitrievich Stolypin (1822–1899) was an Imperial Russian general of artillery, governor of Eastern Rumelia and commandant of the Kremlin Palace guard. He was the father of Pyotr Stolypin. His second wife was Natalia Mikhailovna Stolypina (née Gorchakova), the daughter of Prince Mikhail Dmitrievich Gorchakov, the Commanding general of the Russian infantry during the Crimean War and later the governor general of Warsaw.

Sources

External links 
 Фонд изучения наследства П. А. Столыпина . П. С. Кабытов «Аркадий Дмитриевич Столыпин».
 Александр Мураев. Столыпин Аркадий Дмитриевич.
 Середниково

1822 births
1899 deaths
Imperial Russian Army generals
Russian military personnel of the Crimean War